Bahari is a tehsil and a village panchayat in Sidhi district in the Indian state of Madhya Pradesh. Bhopal is the state capital for Bahari village. It is located around 587 km from Bahari. The other nearest state capital from Bahari is Lucknow and its distance is 385.1 km. The other surrounding state capitals are Patna 442.7 km and Ranchi 416.6 km

Geography
It has an average elevation of 394 metres (1292.65 feet). It belongs to Rewa Division . It is located 34 km towards East from District headquarters Sidhi. 29.7 km from Sihawal. 587 km from State capital Bhopal. Bhanwari (1.5 km), Mayapur (2 km), Patai (1 km), Itarsi Devgwan (1 km), Chandwahi (2), Mauganj (59), paigma (3), Mudwani (1 km), Dhutpura Kothar (1 km) are the nearby villages. Bahari is surrounded by Deosar Tehsil to the south, Sidhi Tehsil to the west, Hanumana Tehsil to the northn and Chitrangi Tehsil to the east.

Nearby cities include Sidhi, Mauganj, Singrauli, Obra, Allahabad (153 km) and Varanasi (184 km).

Demographics

Political overview
Indian National Congress, BJP, Bajarang Dal, Shivsena, BSP are the major political parties in this area.

Polling Stations /Booths near Bahari-
 Bhanwari
 Keswahi 
 Chandwahi 
 Bahari 
 Devganva

Colleges near Bahari
Govt. Art & Commerce College Majhauli - Madwas & Khadaura Road Near Diyadol, Majhauli
Tata College - Sidhi
Bhoj Open University - Village Patulakhi Sidhi M.p.
RIT COllege - Deosar Road, Bahari
Mukund College - Near Bahari Dam, Bahari

Schools in Bahari
Govt Higher Secondary School (Trival) Bahari - Bahari, Sihawal, Sidhi, Madhya Pradesh . 
Nilkanth School Bahari - Near chaturvedi Petrol Pump, Bahari
Aman Convent High School, Bahari - Near Bus Stand, Bahari  
Sarswati Shishu Mandir Bahari 
Golden Star School (English Medium) Bahari  Near Chaturvedi Filling Station, Deosar road bahari
Mukund Public School, Bahari - New Bahari Dam, Bahari

Places to visit
 Shri Neelkanth Swami Mauhaar Dhaam, Mauhaar 
 Maa Sharda Mandir, Karkachaha
 Rani Kumari Mandir, Lauaa
 Son Ghadhiyaal Abhyarany
 ShriVats Seva Sansthan, Bahari 
 Son River
 Gopad Banas River
 Budhi Mata Mandir Patulakhi.

Notable people

Riti Pathak, (BJP) Member of Parliament, Parliamentary Constituency No. 11 Sidhi

References

Sidhi